Clayson Rubens Dantas Queiroz (born 15 October 1978 in Belém), known as Clayson Rato, is a Brazilian footballer who currently plays for Murici FC.

Playing career
Clayson Rato began his football career with Paysandu Sport Club, the club he supported in his youth. He scored a goal as the club defeated Ponte Preta 4–3 during the 2002 Campeonato Brasileiro Série A.

Clayson had stints with clubs with Clube do Remo, Esporte Clube Rio Verde, and Abaete Futebol Clube.  In 2006, he went abroad to Canada to sign with the Toronto Lynx of the USL First Division. His signing was announced in a press conference where the Lynx introduced two more signings from Brazil. Clayson failed to make an appearance during his short stint with Toronto, as he did not fit into Duncan Wilde's vision for the club and was subsequently deemed as surplus. In order to make room for new additional signings, Clayson's contract was bought out by the Brampton Stallions of the Canadian Soccer League.

Clayson made his debut for the Stallions in a match against London City, where he recorded his first goal of the season in a 6-0 thrashing over City at home. Clayson would further contribute to the Stallions by scoring another goal in 6–0 victory over the Caribbean Selects. He had a relatively successful tenure with Brampton, where he led that Stallions to five game undefeated streak and finished off the season with three goals and four assists. He helped the Brampton side clinch a playoff spot by finishing second in the National Division. After his stint in Canada came to a conclusion, Clayson returned to Brazil to have stints with Anápolis Futebol Clube, Gama, and returned to the Campeonato Brasileiro Série D to sign with CSA.

References

1978 births
Living people
Brazilian footballers
Canadian Soccer League (1998–present) players
Association football midfielders
Toronto Lynx players
Brampton Stallions (Hitmen) players
USL First Division players
Paysandu Sport Club players
Sport Club do Recife players
Anápolis Futebol Clube players
Sociedade Esportiva do Gama players
Centro Sportivo Alagoano players
Murici Futebol Clube players
Sportspeople from Belém